is a Sega Mega Drive baseball video game released in 1990. Along with Tel-Tel Mahjong it is a part of the Tel-Tel series and allows for online multiplayer through the Sega MegaModem and the Sega Net Work System, as well play against computer opponents.

Gameplay

The player becomes the coach as the individual players are not directly controlled. Instead, commands are given for pitching and batting; which may or may not be obeyed depending on the situation. The multiplayer mode is text-only while the single-player game has all the graphics in addition to the text. Thirty different teams are available in this game; with options ranging from actual Nippon Professional Baseball teams to little league baseball teams and even a team of professional wrestlers.

Reception
On release, Famitsu magazine scored the game a 26 out of 40.

References

1990 video games
Baseball video games
Japan-exclusive video games
Sega Genesis games
Sega Genesis-only games
Sega Meganet games
Sunsoft games
Multiplayer and single-player video games
Video games developed in Japan